The Plainview Carnegie Library in Plainview, Nebraska is a Carnegie library which was built in 1916–1917.  It was listed on the National Register of Historic Places in 1993.

It is a one-story  brick building with a raised basement.  It has a hipped roof with wide eaves and modillions.  It has Prairie Style details.  It was designed by Norfolk, Nebraska architect J.C. Stitt and built by contractor Frank T. Houx.

Its lower level was renovated to include a children's reading room in 1977.  In 1992 the building still served as a library.

Plainview was one of 68 communities in Nebraska that were awarded Carnegie library grant funds.

References

External links

Libraries on the National Register of Historic Places in Nebraska
Prairie School architecture
Library buildings completed in 1917
Buildings and structures in Pierce County, Nebraska
Carnegie libraries in Nebraska